The Kawai R-100 is drum machine released in 1987. The R-100 is the bigger brother of the R-50 and having velocity sensitive pads unlike the R-50. It has 24 on board samples that are 12-bit PCM format with a sample rate of 32kHz and eight individual outputs as well as stereo and mono outputs for routing to an external mixing desk.

Notable users
 Jan Hammer
 Steve Smith
 Rob Lippert
 Al Jourgensen
 Michael Jackson (Bad Album)

Sounds
3 bass drums, 2 tom toms, 2 ride cymbals, 2 crash cymbals, 3 snares, 2 hi hats, claps, tambourine, china cymbal, agogo, cowbell, conga, claves, shaker, and timbale.

Memory cartridge slot
The separately available RC-16 cartridge stored  all data  currently from the  R-100's internal memory. 

The RC-16 cartridge (available separately) stores backup copies of all information currently in the R-100's internal memory.

Sequencer
Can hold up to 3500 notes.

References

External links

Kawai synthesizers
Drum machines